Nanaimo is a partially elevated station on the Expo Line of Metro Vancouver's SkyTrain rapid transit system. The station is located on Nanaimo Street between Vanness Avenue and East 24th Avenue in Vancouver, British Columbia, Canada. The station takes its name from Nanaimo Street, which is named after the city of Nanaimo on Vancouver Island. Situated on a hillcrest, the station provides riders with a view of the west side and Downtown Vancouver.

History
Nanaimo station was opened in 1985 as part of the original SkyTrain system (now known as the Expo Line). The Austrian architecture firm Architektengruppe U-Bahn was responsible for designing the station.

The station is the westernmost station on the Expo Line that sits atop of the former Central Park Line of the British Columbia Electric Railway. This line formerly ran just west of Nanaimo station to where New Westminster station is located today.

In 2002, Millennium Line service was introduced to the station, which provided outbound service to VCC–Clark station (originally Commercial Drive) via Columbia station in New Westminster. This service was discontinued and replaced with an Expo Line branch to Production Way–University station in 2016.

In the fourth quarter of 2018, TransLink was scheduled to begin a major upgrade of the station's bus exchange and entrance plaza to "improve safety and comfort for [the station's] passengers and to prepare for future service expansions". Construction began on the expansion of the bus loop on January 4, 2019, and was scheduled to be completed in the fourth quarter of 2019. The completion date was later pushed back to early 2020. The bus loop was largely complete by July 9, 2020.

Station information

Station layout

Entrances
Nanaimo station is served by a single entrance located at the west end of that station. The entrance is accessible from Nanaimo Street, south of East 24th Avenue across the street from Vanness Avenue.

Transit connections

Bus bay assignments are as follows:

See also
Filipino Plaza

References

Expo Line (SkyTrain) stations
Railway stations in Canada opened in 1985
Buildings and structures in Vancouver
1985 establishments in British Columbia